The 16th District of the Iowa House of Representatives in the state of Iowa.

Current elected officials
Brent Siegrist is the representative currently representing the district.

Past representatives
The district has previously been represented by:
 James E. Wirtz, 1971–1973
 Semor C. Tofte, 1973–1983
 Clifford Branstad, 1983–1997
 Henry Rayhons, 1997–2003
 Chuck Gipp, 2003–2009
 John W. Beard, 2009–2011
 Bob Hager, 2011–2013
 Mary Ann Hanusa, 2013–2021
 Brent Siegrist, 2021–present

References

016